The Yakovlev Yak-48 is a twin-engined long-range business jet or regional carrier.

Design and development

The Yakovlev Yak-48 was developed in 1989 as a long-range business jet capable of seating up to eight passengers and traveling from New York to Paris, or as a local-service airliner with seats for up to eighteen. It was to have been powered by two rear-mounted Pratt & Whitney Canada PW305 turbofans. Once the design was completed development proceeded quickly.

Specifications (Yak-48)

See also

References

External links 
 

Yak-048
1980s Soviet airliners